Proposition 23, officially the Protect the Lives of Dialysis Patients Act Initiative, is a California ballot proposition that appeared on the ballot for the general election on November 3, 2020. The proposition would increase regulations in Californian dialysis clinics, requiring them to have on-site physicians during treatment, report data on infections that might have been caused by dialyses, seek permission from the government of California prior to closing a clinic and strengthening anti-discrimination protections for dialysis patients.

An overwhelming majority of California voters rejected this measure, by a margin of 63% to 37%, a margin of 26 percentage points.

Background 
Among other regulations, discrimination against patients on the basis of the source of payment for their care would be explicitly outlawed.

Last Week Tonight with John Oliver outlined many of the problems inherent in the dialysis industry in California.

Polling 
In order to pass, it needs a simple majority (>50%).

See also

Notes

References 

2020 California ballot propositions
Healthcare reform in California
Renal dialysis